Skeletonwitch is an American metal band from Athens, Ohio, formed in 2003. The band currently consists of lead guitarist Nate Garnette, rhythm guitarist Scott Hedrick,  bassist Evan Linger, and vocalist Adam Clemans. Original vocalist Chance Garnette was fired from the band sometime in late 2014, or early 2015. In early 2018, drummer Dustin Boltjes left the band as well after a 7-year tenure. Jon Rice, formerly of Job for a Cowboy, is currently substituting on drums for live performances.

History
Skeletonwitch was formed in 2003 in Athens, Ohio. Guitarist Hedrick heard the demo tracks from Nate Garnette's former band, Serkesoron, while they were both college students at Ohio University and decided to form a band. Skeletonwitch released their first album, At One with the Shadows,  on August 11, 2004 with Shredded Records. After forming the band, they sought a vocalist, whom they ultimately found in Nate's older brother, Chance Garnette. These three have been the only constant members, having gone through three drummers: Tony Laureano, Derrick "Mullet Chad" Nau replacing Jimi Shestina, then Eric Harris with Evan Linger on bass guitar.

After being signed to Prosthetic, Skeletonwitch released Beyond the Permafrost on October 2, 2007. In 2008, Skeletonwitch was featured as one of four opening acts for Danzig's Blackest of the Black tour.

On October 13, 2009, Skeletonwitch released their third studio album, Breathing the Fire, which debuted at No. 151 on the Billboard 200 charts. Skeletonwitch's song "Soul Thrashing Black Sorcery" was featured on the soundtrack of the video game Brütal Legend. The song "Crushed Beyond Dust" became featured on the Rock Band network on February 28, 2010. Skeletonwitch was featured on all of the dates of Ozzfest 2010.

Skeletonwitch was featured on an Adult Swim video for their song "Bringers of Death" in 2010. "Bringers of Death" also appears on the Adult Swim heavy metal compilation titled Metal Swim.

In March 2011, Skeletonwitch parted ways with drummer Derrick "Mullet Chad" Nau and temporarily replaced him with Tony Laureano. Skeletonwitch's fourth studio album, Forever Abomination, was released on October 7, 2011. It is the first album to feature Dustin Boltjes on drums, replacing Derrick Nau. Skeletonwitch was banned from playing the House of Blues in Orlando after they were deemed "unfit to be associated with Disney." The band released its fifth studio album Serpents Unleashed  in October 2013.

Vocalist Chance Garnette withdrew from live appearances partway through a tour in October 2014. Garnette's last show with Skeletonwitch was October 15, 2014, at the Webster Theater in Hartford, CT. Days later he appeared in Worcester District Court in Worcester, Massachusetts, and was "charged with assault and battery on a family/household member", and the case was continued to December 10, 2014.  Garnette was released on $500 bail. He was replaced on a European tour the following March by former Cannabis Corpse vocalist Andy Horn, and it was later confirmed that Garnette stated that he had been fired from the band due to alcohol abuse, for which he sought treatment. His permanent replacement was confirmed in February 2016 as Adam Clemans, frontman of blackened sludge metal band Wolvhammer and former vocalist of Veil of Maya.

On April 26, 2018, the band announced Devouring Radiant Light as the title of their new album being released on July 20, 2018.

Band members

Current members
Nate "N8 Feet Under" Garnette – lead guitar (2003–present)
Scott "Scunty D." Hedrick – rhythm guitar (2003–present)
Evan "Loosh" Linger – bass (2008–present)
Adam Clemans – vocals (2016–present)

Current live musicians
James Stewart – drums (2018–present)
Toby Swope – drums (2019–present)

Former members
Chance Garnette – vocals (2003–2015)
Derrick Nau – drums (2003–2011)
Jimi Shestina – bass (2003–2005)
Eric Harris – bass (2005–2008)
Dustin Boltjes – drums (2011–2018)

Former live musicians
Tony Laureano – drums (2011)
Andy Horn – vocals (2015)
Jon "The Charn" Rice – drums (2018)

Timeline

Discography

Studio albums
 At One with the Shadows (2004)
 Beyond the Permafrost (2007)
 Breathing the Fire (2009)
 Forever Abomination (2011)
 Serpents Unleashed (2013)
 Devouring Radiant Light (2018)

EPs
 Worship the Witch (2006)
 Onward to Battle/The Infernal Resurrection (2011)
 The Apothic Gloom (2016)

Demos
 Demo (2005)

Live albums
 Live at the Union Friday the 13th (2004)

Other appearances
Metal Swim - Adult Swim compilation album (2010)

References

External links

Heavy metal musical groups from Ohio
American thrash metal musical groups
American melodic death metal musical groups
Musical groups established in 2003
Musical groups from Athens, Ohio